Miguel Pérez (born 22 January 1934) is a former Mexican cyclist. He competed in the team pursuit at the 1960 Summer Olympics.

References

External links
 

1934 births
Living people
Mexican male cyclists
Olympic cyclists of Mexico
Cyclists at the 1960 Summer Olympics
Sportspeople from Jalisco
20th-century Mexican people